This is a list of the major honours won by football clubs in Italy. It lists every Italian association football club to have won any of the domestic and international trophies recognized as major titles by FIFA.

Honours table

Numbers in bold are Italian record totals for that competition.

References

External links
Italy - List of Champions on RSSSF.com
Italy - List of Cup Finals on RSSSF.com
Italy Super Cup Finals on RSSSF.com

Italy by honours
 
clubs by honour